Earth Groans is a metalcore band that formed in May 2015. The band is from South Dakota.

History 

The band formed in May 2015, in South Dakota. The band formed because of vocalist Jeremy Schaeffer, who felt called to ministry. A week after this feeling, he formed the band with guitarist Zachariah Mayfield, bassist Kaden Burton and drummer Brady Mueller. Two years after formation, they signed to Solid State Records. The band has been touring relentlessly, many times by themselves. Soon after signing, the band released Renovate on May 12. The band recently embarked on a tour with Convictions, with Darkness Divided taking the second half, replacing the band. In 2018, Rahab was released. In 2020, the band released their third EP, Prettiest of Things. On March 19, 2020, both Mayfield and Burton announced their departure from the band. On March 3, 2023, the band released their fourth EP, Tongue Tied.

Style 

The band has been stated to sound similar to many of the influential Christian hardcore and Christian metalcore acts such as Norma Jean and The Chariot.

Members
Current
 Jeremy Schaeffer - vocals (2015–present), guitars (2020–present), bass (2020–2021)

Live
 Dakota Testa - guitar (2021-present)
 Nick Pocock - bass (2021–present)
 Elijah Shoffner - bass (2022-present) (Deathbreaker)
 Blaise Turcato - drums (2021) (Sorry, No Sympathy) 
 Isaiah Perez - drums (2021–present) (ex-Spoken, Phinehas, Love and Death)
 Derek Ludgate - drums (2022-present) 

Former
 Zachariah Mayfield - guitars (2015–2020)
 Kaden Burton - bass (2015–2020)
 Brady Mueller - drums (2015–2021)

Timeline

Discography 
EPs
 Renovate (2017; Solid State Records)
 Rahab (2018; Solid State Records)
 Prettiest of Things (2020; Solid State Records)
 Tongue Tied (2023)

Music videos
 "Driving Out" (2017)

References

External links 

Twitter
Instagram

Musical groups established in 2015
Metalcore musical groups from South Dakota
Solid State Records artists
2015 establishments in South Dakota